Kampong Preah is a khum (commune) of Sangkae District in Battambang Province in north-western Cambodia.

Villages

 Prey Chaek
 Panhnha
 Kralanh
 Kampong Preah
 Andoung Trach
 Srah Kaev

References

Communes of Battambang province
Sangkae District